Belvedere is a settlement on the north coast of the island of Saint Croix in the United States Virgin Islands. Belvedere lies along North Shore Road or Route 80.

History
The area was a major sugar producing area during the colonial period. Belvedere was exploited by the Danish at least as far back as 1763. There is a historic sugar plantation located at Belvedere. A sugar mill was built by the Danish at Belvedere in 1795. Today this is known as the Estate Belvedere, a lavish location for wedding receptions.

Geography
To the west of the village is the aptly named Cane Bay. Belvedere lies along the Ram Head Trail which leads along the coast to Belvedere, overlooking the bay.

Estate Belvedere
The sugar mill has been converted to Estate Belvedere, a luxury villa regularly used for wedding receptions; it retains much of its original structure. and covers 8,400 square feet. The villa has 6 bedrooms and accommodates 14 people, with king-sized beds and charges up to $1400 a night. It consists of several buildings; the main house contains a library and a gourmet kitchen and has 2 king bedrooms and a queen bedroom and there is a detached cottage which accommodates two people. Past the courtyard fountain is a two-story guesthouse with two suites, containing two queen sized beds and a kitchen. The estate is noted for its three and a half acres of gardens with flowering hibiscus and bougainvillea, multi level terraces and historical ruins. The villa also has a notable collection of Caribbean art and historical memorabilia and a powder room with a handpainted tropical mural.

References

External links

Historic American Engineering Record in the United States Virgin Islands
Populated places in Saint Croix, U.S. Virgin Islands